Meowth's Party (ニャースのパーティ, Nyāsu no Pāti) is the 7th ending theme song of the Pokémon anime series. It was used in the original Japanese versions of episodes 117 through 141. The lyrics are by Akihito Toda. It first gained exposure internationally, when it was recreated as an interactive technical demo showcased at the 2000 Nintendo Space World convention, demonstrating the GameCube's graphic capabilities. In the demo, Team Rocket's Meowth is seen entertaining guests at a party with his red guitar. The demo featured Pokémon from the Red, Blue (Green in Japan), Gold and Silver versions of the Pokémon video games. The demo was created by the same team who created Pokémon Stadium for the Nintendo 64.

Summary

Meowth is seen dancing with his associates, Team Rocket members Jessie (Musashi in the original Japanese version) (voiced by Megumi Hayashibara) and James (Kojiro) (voiced by Shin-ichiro Miki), and their two Pokémon, Arbok and Weezing (Matadogasu). In both the ending sequence, and the tech demo, he is voiced by Inuko Inuyama, who voices the character in the Japanese version of the anime series (where the character is known as Nyarth). In the United States, Kids' WB! aired the original Japanese version after the episode, "The Pokémon Water War", and an English dub of the song after the episode, "Pokémon Food Fight!". The English dub also features Maddie Blaustein as Meowth, Rachael Lillis as Jessie, and Eric Stuart as James, who were voicing their respective characters in the series at the time and it has new lyrics. This ending was never aired again on the network.

The animation for both versions was composed in 3-D computer graphics, with the exception of Jessie and James, who, in the ending sequence, remain as 2-D cels in the style of Paper Mario and PaRappa the Rapper.

Meowth sings the song at his party in the Pokémon episode titled Pichu Bros. in Party Panic, a special episode only available for viewing on the GameCube game Pokémon Channel. Unlike the rest of the episode, this section uses 3-D computer graphics and Meowth's actions are selected randomly for each viewing.

In Super Smash Bros. Melee, there is a trophy of Meowth holding a red guitar. The character model is the same as the Meowth from Meowth's Party. The description also mentions Meowth's Party and even gives a brief explanation about it.

CD single
Meowth's Party (ニャースのパーティ Nyarth's Party) is a mini CD single that was released on October 27, 1999 in Japan. The lyrics were by Akihito Toda, the songs were composed and arranged by Hirokazu Tanaka. The song is performed by Nyarth / Meowth (Inuko Inuyama) with guest vocals by Musashi / Jessie (Megumi Hayashibara), Kojiro / James (Shin-ichiro Miki).

Amazon.com has a listing with information on the single but it is usually out of stock. Packaged with the single is a small poster with a screenshot from the ending sequence and the lyrics to the songs. There is also a 41 second long fifth track that isn't listed on the packaging.

Track list
 Meowth's Party ニャースのパーティ
 Meowth's Song 2000 ニャースのうた2000
 As I Said と★いってるニャ
 Meowth's Party (Karaoke) ニャースのパーティ(オリジナルカラオケ)
 Meowth's Rant (hidden track, not listed on packaging)

References

See also
Meowth's Party (Bulbapedia)

Technology demonstrations
Songs from Pokémon
Songs about parties
Songs about fictional male characters
Songs about cats
Songs about Team Rocket